The 1967 Glamorgan County Council election was held on Thursday 13 April 1967 in the county of Glamorgan, Wales, to elect members to Glamorgan County Council. The previous full council elections were in 1964 and the final elections to the council would come in 1970.

Overview of the result

The Labour Party lost nine seats at this election but retained a strong majority with 50 councillors, as well as the support of 22 Labour aldermen. Plaid Cymru representation returned to the council after their candidates beat Labour in two seats, with the victorious candidate in Ferndale being afterwards carried down the road by supporters. The Liberal Party won two seats, their first on the council. One seat was won by Ratepayers, also their first on the council. The Conservative Party won two seats, as did the Communist Party. In Hengoed, the previously sitting Labour councillor, who had been expelled from the party prior to the election, was returned as an Independent Labour councillor.

Both the Labour and Conservative spokespersons described the swing against Labour as being a result of national issues, with the UK Labour government at that time becoming less popular.

Ward results

Contests took place in thirty electoral wards:

Aberaman

Aberavon

Blaengwawr

Bridgend

Caerphilly

Castell Coch

Cilfynydd

Coedffranc

Coity

Cowbridge

Cwmavon

Ferndale

Councillor James had lost the seat to Labour at the 1964 elections. Following his victory he was carried down the street outside the North Road School polling station by "excited" supporters.

Gadlys

Garw Valley

Gower

Councillor Keal became the first Liberal councillor in the area since World War II.

Hengoed

Councillor Blatchford had represented the seat for 7 years for the Labour Party, but was expelled for opposing the official candidate, so stood and won as an Independent.

Hopkinstown

Laleston

Llwydcoed

Maesteg

Gibbs had missed winning the seat, by only 3 votes, in the 1964 election.

Mountain Ash (Penrhiwceiber ward)

Neath North

Ogmore Valley

Pontypridd

Porthcawl

Port Talbot East

Port Talbot West

Pyle

Sandfields (Port Talbot)

Ystrad (Rhondda)

References

Glamorgan
Glamorgan County Council elections
20th century in Glamorgan